The Lake Constance Belt Railway is a name used for several contiguous railway lines around along the northern shore of Lake Constance (Bodensee) in southern Germany. It was coined around 1900, when the railway ring around the lake was finished, and consists of the following sections:

 Konstanz–Radolfzell, part of the High Rhine Railway (opened in 1863)
 Radolfzell–Stahringen, part of the Radolfzell–Mengen railway (opened in 1867)
 Stahringen–Friedrichshafen Stadt (opened in 1895–1901)
 Friedrichshafen Stadt–Lindau-Aeschach Abzw (opened in 1899)
 Lindau-Aeschach Abzw–Lindau-Insel, part of the Buchloe–Lindau railway (opened in 1854)
 Lindau-Insel–Wolfurt-Lauterach Nord, part of the Lindau–Bludenz railway (opened in 1872)
 Wolfurt-Lauterach Nord–St. Margrethen (opened in 1873)
 St. Margrethen–Rorschach, part of the Chur–Rorschach railway (opened in 1858)
 Rorschach–Konstanz, part of the Lake Line (opened in 1869–1871)

The lines mostly run parallel to the shore, only the Konstanz–Ludwigshafen, Uhldingen-Mühlhofen–Fischbach and Bregenz–Staad sections run through the hinterland. Today the term is only used for the German line from Radolfzell via Friedrichshafen to Lindau.

References

Railway lines in Baden-Württemberg
Railway lines in Bavaria
Railway lines opened in 1895
1895 establishments in Germany